Boneh-ye Zolfaqar (also Romanized as Boneh-ye Zolfaqār) is a village in Lalar and Katak Rural District, Chelo District, Andika County, Khuzestan Province, Iran. At the 2006 census, its population was 62, in 7 families.

References 

Populated places in Andika County